Euzebyella algicola is a Gram-negative, aerobic and rod-shaped bacterium from the genus of Euzebyella which has been isolated from a green algae from the Jeju Island.

References 

Flavobacteria
Bacteria described in 2018